Pieter Codde also known as Petrus Codde (27 November 1648, in Amsterdam – 18 December 1710, in Utrecht) was apostolic vicar of the Catholic Church's Vicariate Apostolic of Batavia, also known as the Dutch Mission, from 1688 to 1702. He served as the Old Catholic Archbishop of Utrecht from 1688 to 1710.

Life
Codde studied in Leuven, taught by the Oratorians, and was ordained priest in 1672.  In 1688 he was named Vicar Apostolic for the nation, although the Jesuits suspected and accused him of Jansenist sympathies.  He had to justify himself to Rome against these accusations in 1694 and, after being charged with them a second time, in 1697. On the second occasion he went to Rome in person, but his apologia did not satisfy his critics and he was finally suspended from his office in 1702 by Pope Clement XI (with his definitive discharge from the post coming in 1704, thanks to the intervention of Giovanni Battista Bussi).

Jacques Forget wrote, in the Catholic Encyclopedia, that since the Dutch Republic was for the most part Protestant, Catholics there lived under the direction of vicars apostolic. These representatives of the pope were soon won over to the theological position of Jansenism. Johannes van Neercassel, who governed the whole church in the Netherlands from 1663 to 1686, made no secret of his intimacy with the party. Under Neercassel the country began to become the refuge of all whose obstinacy forced them to leave Kingdom of France and Spanish Netherlands as well as a number of priests, monks, and nuns who preferred exile to the acceptance of the pontifical Bulls.

Codde, who succeeded Neercassel in 1686 went further than his predecessor and refused to sign the formulary. He was summoned to Rome, defended himself so poorly that he was first forbidden to exercise his functions, and then deposed by a decree of 1704. Codde died obstinate in 1710.

Gerard Potkamp was appointed as Codde's replacement, but Potkamp and those that followed were rejected by some of the clergy, to whom the States-General lent their support. The conflict lasted a long time, during which the episcopal functions were not fulfilled. In 1723 the Chapter of Utrecht, in this case a group of seven or eight priests who assumed the name and quality in order to put an end to the situation, elected on their own authority the vicar general, Cornelius Steenhoven, as archbishop of Utrecht. This election was not canonical, and was not approved by the pope. Bishop emeritus Paul-Werner Scheele and Bishop emeritus Fritz-René Müller wrote, in the preface to the International Roman Catholic–Old Catholic Dialogue Commission's report The Church and Ecclesial Communion, that these "differences regarding the relationship of the local church and papal primacy" were one of the "major grounds for the separation" of the churches. But the "Old Catholic churches have however never questioned the special position of the pope in the church as a whole," according to Scheele and Müller.

Notes

References

1648 births
1710 deaths
Clergy from Amsterdam
Dutch Old Catholic bishops
Alumni of Oratorian schools
Old University of Leuven alumni
Apostolic vicars of the Holland (Batavia) Mission
17th-century Roman Catholic archbishops in the Dutch Republic
18th-century Roman Catholic archbishops in the Dutch Republic